The Power of the Keys, also known as the Office of the Keys, is a responsibility given to St. Peter to usher in the Kingdom of God on the Day of Pentecost, and a responsibility given to the other apostles by Jesus, according to Matthew 16:19 and . It is understood as a responsibility to admit or exclude from church membership (excommunicate), to set church policy and teachings (dogma), to render binding interpretations of Sacred Scripture (ancient rabbis were known to make binding interpretations of the Mosaic law), and to bind and loose sins. The verb 'to loose' (or to free) is used this way in John 20:23, Revelation 1:5 and by the Early Church Fathers.

In Christianity, "the keys are an office and power given by Christ to the Church for binding and loosing sins." It is a power that Roman Catholics believe to have been conferred first on St. Peter then afterwards on his successors in the office of the Roman Catholic Papacy. There is a description of the conferral of the Power of the Keys on St. Peter (originally named Simon) in Matthew 16:13:

In Matthew chapter 18, 18 through 20, we see Jesus speaking to the disciples, not an individual specifically.  This points to Jesus continuing to instruct the disciples in chapter 16, and perhaps not Peter individually after blessing Peter for having confessed who Jesus was by God's allowance;

This point of view is furthered ( the collective authority / power of the keys ) in the first Council of Jerusalem.

Roman Catholic dogma states that in Matthew 16, Jesus was paraphrasing a passage from Isaiah well known among the Jews (Is 22:15-25) in which Hezekiah, the King of Israel, had a general cabinet of ministers and his chief chamberlain, the Prime Minister Shebna was proved unworthy of his post and was thrown out.  To fill his office, King Hezekiah names Eliakim son of Hilkiah as the new prime minister:

In the Bible, the term keys has been used as a symbol of teaching authority (Lk 11:52). According to Roman Catholics, Jesus, the son of David and hence the King of the new Davidic kingdom, the Church, appoints St. Peter as the Church's primary teacher, an office that will continue to have successors much like Eliakim's position in the Old Testament Davidic kingdom. With these keys, like Eliakim, St. Peter the first Bishop of Rome and his successors are entrusted with Christ's own teaching authority over the new House of David, the Church here on earth (Rev. 1:18, 3:7). Through this office of the Papacy and the Magisterium, Roman Catholics believe that the Kingdom of Heaven governs the Church on earth to lead it to all truth in matters of faith and morals (1 Tim 3:15, Mt 28:20, Jn 16:13). The Vatican's own claims to the Keys as a heraldic statement are limited to the 14th century.

Many Christians point out that Jesus uses much the same language in John 20:23 and therefore conferred some or all of the same powers on all the Apostles. On this basis, Eastern Orthodox believe that the power of the keys is conferred on all bishops. Similarly, Martin Luther and other reformers spoke of the "office of the Keys" as the power of church leaders to admit or exclude from church membership. In the Lutheran Churches, the "Office of the Keys is the special authority which Christ has given to His Church on earth: to forgive the sins of the penitent sinners, but to retain the sins of the impenitent as long as they do not repent." Lutheran doctrine cites  as the basis for the sacrament of Confession and Absolution.

The Methodist tradition holds that the office of the keys is exercised when the Church baptizes an individual and pronounces him/her saved. The office of the keys is furthermore exercised in the Church "binding and loosing", being able to excommunicate individuals from the sacraments as "ordinarily, no one is saved outside the visible church".

See also

 Keys of the kingdom
 Keys of Heaven

References

Catholic doctrines